The 2018 European Judo Championships were held in Tel Aviv, Israel from 26 to 28 April 2018.

Medal overview

Men

Women

Medal table

Participating nations
There was a total of 368 participants from 44 nations.

References

External links 
 Official website
 European Judo Union website
 Results

 
European Judo Championships
Judo, European Championships
European Championships
European Championships 2018
Judo
Judo, European Championships 2018
Judo, European Championships
Judo, European Championships 2018